The following lists events that happened during 1880 in Australia.

Incumbents

Governors
Governors of the Australian colonies:
Governor of New South Wales – Sir Augustus Loftus
Governor of Queensland – Sir Arthur Kennedy
Governor of South Australia – Sir William Jervois
Governor of Tasmania – Frederick Weld until 5 April, vacant thereafter
Governor of Victoria – George Phipps, 2nd Marquess of Normanby

Premiers
Premiers of the Australian colonies:
Premier of New South Wales – Sir Henry Parkes
Premier of Queensland – Thomas McIlwraith
Premier of South Australia – William Morgan
Premier of Tasmania – William Giblin
Premier of Victoria – 
 until 5 March – Graham Berry
 5 March-3 August – James Service
 starting 3 August – Graham Berry

Events
 20 January – Bushranger Captain Moonlite (real name Andrew George Scott) hanged in Sydney.
 31 January – The Bulletin magazine is first published.
 May – School is made compulsory for children aged 6 to 14 in New South Wales.
 28 June – Ned Kelly captured at Glenrowan, Victoria.
 1 October – The Melbourne International Exhibition is opened at the Royal Exhibition Building in Carlton.
 10 October – Geologist Lamont Young and four others disappear on a boat trip north from Bermagui, New South Wales.
 11 November – Bushranger Ned Kelly is hanged.
 23 November – Redmond Barry, the judge who sentenced Ned Kelly to be hanged, dies just twelve days after Kelly was hanged.

Science and technology
 2 February – The first successful shipment of frozen beef and mutton from Australia arrived in London aboard the SS Strathleven.
 August – The first telephone exchange in Australia opened in Melbourne.

Arts and literature

Sport
 Grand Flaneur wins the Melbourne Cup.
 England defeat Australia by 5 wickets in a Cricket Test held at The Oval.

Births
 2 January – Charlie Frazer, politician (died 1913)
15 April – Doug McLean, Sr., rugby footballer (died 1947)
 8 August – Earle Page, the eleventh Prime Minister of Australia (died 1961)
 10 December – Jessie Aspinall, doctor, first female junior medical resident at the Royal Prince Alfred Hospital (died 1953)
 11 December – Frank Tarrant, cricketer (died 1951)

Deaths
 20 January – Captain Moonlight, bushranger (born 1842), hanged
 2 May – Tom Wills, cricketer and founder of Australian rules football (born 1835), suicide
 26 June – Aaron Sherritt, bushranger (born August 1854), shot by Joe Byrne
 28 June – Joe Byrne, bushranger (born November 1856),
 28 June – Steve Hart, bushranger (born February 1859),
 28 June – Dan Kelly, bushranger and the younger brother of Ned Kelly (born June 1861),
 29 July – Charles Hervey Bagot, South Australian pastoralist, mine owner and parliamentarian (b. 1788)
 27 September – Charles Hardwicke, Tasmanian explorer (b. 1788)
 27 October – Samuel Gill, artist (born 1818)
 11 November – Ned Kelly, bushranger (b. c. 1855), hanged
 23 November – Redmond Barry, Judge (born 1813)

References 

 
Australia
Years of the 19th century in Australia